I-Ternal Fire is reggae, dancehall artist Capleton's twentieth studio album. It was released on July 6, 2010. The album is a mix of dancehall and reggae.

Track listing

References

2010 albums
Capleton albums